Prasanta Banerjee is an Indian football midfielder who played for India national football team in the 1984 Asian Cup. He is one of the few players who has captained and won trophies in all three big clubs viz. East Bengal, Mohun Bagan, and Mohammedan Sporting.

Playing career
He started his career at Kalighat in 1975. He joined East Bengal in 1976, and captained the team in 1979–80. Later he joined Mohammedan Sporting followed by Mohun Bagan. He has also captained Bengal in Santosh Trophy and India. He was Player of the Year in 1983. He also played for Mohun Bagan where he managed the club in the I-League.

Managerial career
After retirement, Banerjee completed his AFC A, B, and C licensing courses. He later completed FIFA instructor course and worked as assistant coach of India U-17 team at the 2002–03 AFC U-17 Championship. Banerjee also managed West Bengal in Santosh Trophy, Port Trust and Aryan FC in the Calcutta Football League.

Honours

India
 South Asian Games Gold medal: 1985
Afghanistan Republic Day Cup third place: 1977

Bengal
 Santosh Trophy: 1984

East Bengal
Federation Cup: 1978–79

See also
List of India national football team captains

References

External links
Stats at RSSSF

Living people
Indian footballers
1958 births
India international footballers
1984 AFC Asian Cup players
Mohun Bagan AC managers
Mohun Bagan AC players
East Bengal Club players
Mohammedan SC (Kolkata) players
Calcutta Football League players
Footballers from Kolkata
Indian football managers
I-League managers
Footballers at the 1982 Asian Games
Footballers at the 1986 Asian Games
Association football midfielders
Asian Games competitors for India
South Asian Games medalists in football
South Asian Games gold medalists for India